1524 Joensuu, provisional designation , is a carbonaceous asteroid from the outer region of the asteroid belt, approximately 42 kilometers in diameter. It was discovered on 18 September 1939, by Finnish astronomer Yrjö Väisälä at Turku Observatory in Southwest Finland, and named for the town of Joensuu.

Classification and orbit 

Joensuu is a dark C-type asteroid, that orbits the Sun in the outer main-belt at a distance of 2.7–3.5 AU once every 5 years and 6 months (2,002 days). Its orbit has an eccentricity of 0.12 and an inclination of 13° with respect to the ecliptic.

Physical characteristics 

In October 2005, a rotational lightcurve of Joensuu was obtained from photometric observations by French amateur astronomer Laurent Bernasconi. It gave a well-defined rotation period of 9.276 hours with a change in brightness of 0.33 magnitude.

According to the surveys carried out by the Infrared Astronomical Satellite IRAS, the Japanese Akari satellite, and NASA's Wide-field Infrared Survey Explorer with its subsequent NEOWISE mission, Joensuu measures between 39.37 and 49.39 kilometers in diameter, and its surface has an albedo between 0.034 and 0.07. The Collaborative Asteroid Lightcurve Link derives an albedo of 0.0505 and a diameter of 42.83 kilometers using an absolute magnitude of 10.7.

Naming 

This minor planet was named for the Finnish town Joensuu, where the discoverer received his early schooling. It is located in North Karelia, near the Russian border. The official  was published by the Minor Planet Center on 20 February 1976.

References

External links 
 Asteroid Lightcurve Database (LCDB), query form (info )
 Dictionary of Minor Planet Names, Google books
 Asteroids and comets rotation curves, CdR – Observatoire de Genève, Raoul Behrend
 Discovery Circumstances: Numbered Minor Planets (1)-(5000) – Minor Planet Center
 
 

001524
Discoveries by Yrjö Väisälä
Named minor planets
19390918